Camila Hiruela Tapia (born ) is an Argentine female volleyball player. She is part of the Argentina women's national volleyball team.

She participated in the 2017 FIVB Volleyball Women's U23 World Championship, 2017 FIVB Volleyball World Grand Prix, and 2018 FIVB Volleyball Women's Nations League
 
At club level she played for UTE in 2018.

References

External links 

 FIVB profile

1997 births
Living people
Argentine women's volleyball players
Beach volleyball players at the 2014 Summer Youth Olympics
21st-century Argentine women